Settler colonialism in Australia is the elimination of Indigenous Australians and their replacement by a settler society. Initially carried out by violent means, such as "massacres, forced starvation, poisoning, rape, disease, and incarceration", settler colonialism continues today in the form of cultural assimilation. Settler colonial studies emerged in Australia.

References

Further reading

Settler colonialism
Historiography of Australia